Ludmila Pechmanová-Klosová (born 13 July 1885) was a Czechoslovakian politician. In 1920 she was one of the first group of women elected to the Chamber of Deputies, remaining in parliament until 1935.

Biography
Pechmanová-Klosová was born in the Vinohrady district of Prague in 1885. After finishing her education, she worked as a post office clerk in the city. She became involved in trade unions and was appointed vice-president of the Association of Postal Officials in 1908. The following year she joined the Czech National Social Party.

Following the independence of Czechoslovakia at the end of World War I, Pechmanová-Klosová was a candidate for her party (now renamed the Czechoslovak Socialist Party) for the Chamber of Deputies in the 1920 parliamentary elections, and was one of sixteen women elected to parliament. She was subsequently re-elected in 1925 and 1929, serving until 1935 when poor health prevented her from running for re-election.

References

1885 births
Politicians from Prague
Austro-Hungarian trade unionists
Czechoslovak women in politics
Members of the Chamber of Deputies of Czechoslovakia (1920–1925)
Members of the Chamber of Deputies of Czechoslovakia (1925–1929)
Members of the Chamber of Deputies of Czechoslovakia (1929–1935)
Czech National Social Party politicians
Date of death unknown